Unión San Felipe is a Chilean Football club, their hometown is San Felipe in  the V Región of Valparaíso. They play in the second level of the Chilean football league, the Primera B.
They were the 2009 Copa Chile champions, and played the 2010 Copa Sudamericana.

The club was founded  on October 16, 1956 with the merger of Internacional and Tarcisio.

The club is the only team in Chile ever to win the second level and then the first level in consecutive seasons (1970 and 1971).

Honours
Primera División: 1
1971

Copa Chile: 1
2009

Segunda División de Chile/Primera B: 3
1970, 2000, 2009 Apertura, 2009 season

South American cups history

Current squad

2021 Winter Transfers

In

Out

Managers

  Julio Baldovinos (1961)
  Luis Tirado (1964)
  Luis Santibáñez (1970–72)
  Julio Baldovinos (1982)
  Rolando García (1988)
  Julio Di Meola (1998–99)
  Hernán Godoy (1999)
  Raúl Toro (2000–03)
  Mario Soto (2004)
  Hernán Godoy (2004–05)
  Rubén Espinoza (2006)
  Ariel Paolorossi (2006)
  Daniel Chazarreta (2007–08)
  Héctor Roco (interim) (2008)
  Mario Flores (2008)
  Roberto Mariani (2008–09)
  Gustavo Cisneros (Dec 2009–May 10)
  Ivo Basay (June 2010–Dec 10)
  Nelson Cossio (Dec 2010–Aug 11)
  Daniel Chazarreta (2011)
  Víctor Hugo Marchesini (Aug 2011–Dec 11)
  Nelson Cossio (2011–12)
  Marco Antonio Figueroa (July 2012–Oct 12)
  Daniel Chazarreta (2012)
  Nelson Soto (2012–13)
  Miguel Ponce (2014–15)
  César Vigevani (2015)
  Fernando Guajardo (2015)
  Germán Corengia (2015–16)
  Luis Fredes (2016)
  Christian Lovrincevich (2016)
  Dario Ayude (2017-2018)
  Christian Lovrincevich (2018)
  Dario Hernan Drudi (2018-)

See also
Chilean football league system

References

External links
 Official website 

 
Football clubs in Chile
Association football clubs established in 1956
1956 establishments in Chile